Goman or Gaman, also rendered as Guman, in Iran may refer to:
 Goman, East Azerbaijan
 Gaman, Tabriz, East Azerbaijan Province
 Goman, West Azerbaijan
 Gaman, Tarom, Zanjan Province